Derrick John Kimball (born November 20, 1954) is a lawyer and former political figure in Nova Scotia, Canada. He represented Kings South in the Nova Scotia House of Assembly from 1988 to 1993 as a Progressive Conservative member.

Early life and education
Born in Halifax, the son of Robert Guy Edgar Kimball and Marjorie Coady, he was educated at St. Francis Xavier University and Dalhousie Law School.

Legal career
Kimball served as solicitor for the town of Wolfville from 1978 to 1990.

Political career
He entered provincial politics in the 1988 election, defeating NDP candidate Steve Mattson by 452 votes in the Kings South riding. In late 1992, Kimball lost the Progressive Conservative nomination in Kings South to former MLA and cabinet minister Harry How. Kimball quit the Progressive Conservative caucus in January 1993, and ran as an independent candidate in the 1993 election. He finished third in the election, which saw Liberal Robbie Harrison defeat How by 128 votes.

In December 2020, Kimball was nominated as the Progressive Conservative candidate in Kings South for the 2021 election, but was defeated.

References 
 Entry from Canadian Who's Who

1954 births
Living people
Dalhousie University alumni
Nova Scotia Independent MLAs
People from Halifax, Nova Scotia
People from Kings County, Nova Scotia
Progressive Conservative Association of Nova Scotia MLAs
St. Francis Xavier University alumni